This article contains a list of bridges designed by John Carr.

Map

Bridges by architect John Carr

Notes

References

Grade II listed buildings in North Yorkshire
Grade II listed buildings in the East Riding of Yorkshire
Bridges in the United Kingdom